Donald Robertson was a Canadian politician and an Liberal Conservative MPP for Niagara in the Legislative Assembly of Ontario. Robertson was the MPP between September 3, 1867 and December 27, 1867.

References

External links 
 

19th-century Canadian politicians
Progressive Conservative Party of Ontario MPPs